Old Razorback Mountain is a  summit located in Pershing County, Nevada, United States.

Description
Old Razorback Mountain is part of the Selenite Range which is a subset of the Great Basin Ranges. This peak is set on land managed by the Bureau of Land Management. Old Razorback Mountain is an iconic spectacle at this art festival. Trego Hot Springs is located at the foot of the mountain's north base. This landform's toponym has been officially adopted by the U.S. Board on Geographic Names.

Climate
Old Razorback Mountain is set in the Black Rock Desert which has hot summers and cold winters. The desert is an example of a cold desert climate as the desert's elevation makes temperatures cooler than lower elevation deserts. Due to the high elevation and aridity, temperatures drop sharply after sunset. Summer nights are comfortably cool. Winter highs are generally above freezing, and winter nights are bitterly cold, with temperatures often dropping well below freezing.

Gallery

See also
 
 Great Basin

References

External links

 Weather forecast: Old Razorback Mountain

Mountains of Pershing County, Nevada
Mountains of Nevada
North American 1000 m summits
Mountains of the Great Basin